Félicia Menara (born 23 June 1991) is a French female former volleyball player, playing as a setter. She was part of the France women's national volleyball team.

She competed at the 2009 Women's European Volleyball Championship. On club level she played for IFVB Tolosa in 2009.

References

External links
 
 

1991 births
Living people
French women's volleyball players
Place of birth missing (living people)